Tibshelf services, opened in 1999, is a motorway service area operated by Roadchef, between junctions 28 and 29 of the M1 motorway in Derbyshire, England. It lies about a kilometre southeast of the village of Tibshelf, but the site is closer to the villages of Newton and Blackwell.

Facilities
The northbound side is being refurbished with a McDonald's, a Fresh Food Cafe and a Costa.

References

External links 
 Tibshelf services - Motorway Services Online
 Motorway Services Trivia Website - Tibshelf

Bolsover District
Economy of Derbyshire
M1 motorway service stations
RoadChef motorway service stations